Sauresia sepsoides, the Hispaniolan four-toed galliwasp or common four-toed galliwasp, is a species of lizard of the Diploglossidae family endemic to the Caribbean island of Hispaniola (in both the Dominican Republic and Haiti). It is the only member of the genus Sauresia.

Taxonomy
It was formerly classified in the genus Celestus, but was moved back to Sauresia in 2021.

References

Diploglossidae
Endemic fauna of Hispaniola
Taxa named by John Edward Gray
Lizards of the Caribbean